The Palm Treo 700wx is a smartphone offered by Sprint, Alltel and Verizon as an update to Palm's earlier release of the Verizon-only Treo 700w. It is Palm's second Windows Mobile Treo.

Specifications
Mobile phone, CDMA model with 800/1900-MHz bands, CDMA2000 1x and CDMA2000 EV-DO networks
Intel PXA272 312 MHz processor with Intel XScale Technology
128 MB (63 MB user-available) non-volatile memory
64 MB (57.5 user-available) RAM
Removable rechargeable lithium ion battery (1800mAh)
Windows Mobile 5.0 Phone Edition 2005
4.4 H x 2.3 W x 0.9 D inches (11.3 x 5.9 x 2.3 cm)
6.3 oz. (178 grams)
16-bit Color 240 x 240 TFT touchscreen display
Supports SD, SDIO and MMC expansion cards
Built-In Bluetooth 1.2 Compliance
1.3-megapixel (1280x1024 resolution, JPEG) digital camera with 2x digital zoom, video camera capability (176x144pixel @ 20fps, 3gpp, mp4, mjpeg)
Talk time: up to 4.7 hours, standby time: up to 15 days
No integrated Wi-Fi or GPS support (Wi-Fi card and Bluetooth GPS adapter can be purchased separately)

Additional features
The 700wx comes with a standard set of Windows Mobile smartphone features such as Microsoft Exchange Active Sync push email for Microsoft Outlook and Microsoft Office Mobile, with file support for Microsoft Word, Excel, and PowerPoint. Microsoft ActiveSync is used to synchronize the phone with the user's desktop.

See also
Treo 700p - Corresponding Palm OS device.
Treo 700w - Previous generation model

References
Treo 700w/wx Specifications

Windows Mobile Professional devices
Palm mobile phones